Clive James Standen (born 22 July 1981) is an English actor best known for playing Bryan Mills in the NBC series Taken (2017–2018), based on the film trilogy of the same name, as well as Rollo in the History Channel series Vikings (2013–2018), Sir Gawain in the Starz series Camelot, Archer in the BBC One series Robin Hood, and Private Carl Harris in the BBC science-fiction programme Doctor Who.

Early life and education
Clive James Standen was born on a British Army base in Holywood, County Down, Northern Ireland, and grew up in Leicestershire, East Midlands, England. He went to school at the King Edward VII School, Melton Mowbray followed by a performing arts course at Melton Mowbray College. Standen then went on to earn a place on the 3 year diploma course in Acting at the London Academy of Music and Dramatic Art. Away from acting, in his late teens Standen was a former international Muay Thai boxer and later Fencing gold medallist.

Career
Standen's first experience of stunts, horse riding and sword fighting was at age 12 when he got his first job working in a professional stunt team in Nottingham. At the age of 15 Standen was a member of both the National Youth Theatre and the National Youth Music Theatre performing in productions at many well known venues. Later Standen won a place on the three-year acting course at the London Academy of Music and Dramatic Art.

In 2004, Standen appeared in Waking the Dead; the Second World War documentary drama Ten Days to D-Day; and took the lead role of Major Alan Marshall in Zero Hour a TV dramatisation of Special Air Service mission operation Barras in Sierra Leone. The next year he appeared in three episodes of the British soap Doctors and Tom Brown's Schooldays, the acclaimed ITV adaptation of the book by Thomas Hughes. Standen played Private Carl Harris in three episodes of the fourth series of the relaunched British sci-fi programme Doctor Who. The following year he played Archer, the half-brother of Robin Hood in the BBC One series Robin Hood. Standen was part of the main cast of the TV series Camelot for Starz in which he portrayed the famous Arthurian knight Sir Gawain.

In film, Standen took a supporting role in the mainstream Bollywood film Namastey London, starring Akshay Kumar and Katrina Kaif. In 2012, Standen completed filming on the Vertigo Films feature film Hammer of the Gods. He is a series lead on the History Channel's Vikings in the role of Rollo. Clive portrayed Bryan Mills in the television adaption of Taken  then starred as Colonel Knox in the Screen Gems thriller film Patient Zero. Standen was cast in the main role of Anthony Lavelle for NBC's Council of Dads; the following year the programme was cancelled after one series.

In 2021, Standen and Amy Bailey (who played Kwenthrith in Vikings) teamed up to create the Vikcast podcast about the Vikings TV series they will co-host, with Bailey stating: "We've gathered our beloved castmates, production members, and celebrity guests to talk about the show and everything beyond."

In addition to his screen roles, Standen has done voice overs for video games such as Aliens vs. Predator and Inversion.

Activism
Standen is a spokesman for Sea Shepherd Conservation Society.

Personal life
He married Francesca de Takats in 2007 at Babington House They have three children.

Filmography

Film

Television

Video games

Stage

References

External links

 
 Vikcast at Spreaker

1981 births
Living people
English male film actors
English male television actors
English male stage actors
National Youth Theatre members
Male Shakespearean actors from Northern Ireland
People from Melton Mowbray
Alumni of the London Academy of Music and Dramatic Art
English male musical theatre actors
English male video game actors
English male voice actors
English Muay Thai practitioners
21st-century English male actors
Musicians from Leicestershire
Male actors from Leicestershire